Markus Poschner (born 1971, Munich) is a German conductor and pianist.

Biography
Poschner studied at the University of Music and Performing Arts Munich with Hermann Michael. His mentors and supporters included Sir Roger Norrington, Sir Colin Davis and Jorma Panula.  

From 2000 to 2006, Poschner was chief conductor of the Georgisches Kammerorchester Ingolstadt.  He has also been first Kapellmeister of the Komische Oper Berlin.  From 2007 to 2017, Poschner was Generalmusikdirektor (GMD) of the city of Bremen, which encompassed chief conductorships of the Bremer Philharmoniker and of the Theater Bremen.

Poschner became chief conductor of the Orchestra della Svizzera Italiana as of the 2015-2016 season.  In February 2015, the Bruckner Orchestra Linz announced the appointment of Poschner as its next chief conductor, effective with the 2017-2018 season.  

Outside of Europe, Poschner has served as principal guest conductor of the Orquesta Sinfonica de Chile.  Poschner is also known as a jazz pianist.  Since 2010, he is an honorary professor at the University of Bremen, where he teaches courses in musicology and music education.

Awards and honours
 2004: Winner of the Deutscher Dirigentenpreis
 2018: Winner of the ICMA International Classical Music Awards with the Orchestra della Svizzera Italiana in the Category DVD PERFORMANCE for Rereading Brahms – Brahms: The Symphonies (Sony Classical)

References

External links

 Official homepage of Markus Poschner
 Künstleragentur Dr. Raab & Dr. Böhm agency page on Markus Poschner
 Orchestra della Svizzera Italiana page on Markus Poschner
 Markus Poschner im Porträt, Biographie on Klassik.com
 Markus Poschner discography at Naxos Records
 

 

German conductors (music)
1971 births
Living people
Musicians from Munich